Colchester is a city in McDonough County, Illinois, United States. The population was 1,108 at the 2020 census, down from 1,401 in 2010. The city is named after the town of Colchester, England.

Geography
Colchester is located in western McDonough County at  (40.425174, -90.792339). U.S. Route 136 passes through the center of town as Macomb Street and North Street, leading northeast  to Macomb, the county seat, and west  to Carthage.

History
Coal was discovered near Colchester in the 1850s.

According to the North American Stratigraphic Code, rock units were given names that included the geographic name of a location where the rock unit was first described. If the rock unit consisted of a dominant rock type, the rock type was included in the name. In this case, when coal was first discovered and described in Colchester, Illinois, the rock unit was named "Colchester Coal". When this particular coal unit was encountered in a different location, the coal was correctly identified as Colchester Coal.

The mines in Colchester attracted immigrants from Pennsylvania. At first these included the descendants of Irish Protestant refugees from the Irish Rebellion of 1798. Later they were joined by Irish Catholic refugees from the Great Famine.

During the 1920s, Colchester was the home of Henry "Kelly" Wagle, a bootlegger associated with Al Capone. Wagle was involved in the production of alcohol and its transportation between Chicago and Kansas City.

On September 11, 1921, members of the disgraced Chicago "Black Sox" baseball team played with the Colchester team in a game against nearby Macomb. Kelly Wagle paid to bring the players to Colchester.

Demographics

At the 2000 census, there were 1,493 people, 634 households and 419 families residing in the city. The racial makeup of the city was 99.40% White, 0.07% Native American, 0.07% Asian, and 0.47% from two or more races. Hispanic or Latino of any race were 0.60% of the population.

There were 634 households, of which 29.8% had children under the age of 18 living with them, 50.8% were married couples living together, 12.1% had a female householder with no husband present, and 33.8% were non-families. 30.6% of all households were made up of individuals, and 13.2% had someone living alone who was 65 years of age or older. The average household size was 2.32 and the average family size was 2.89.

22.9% of the population were under the age of 18, 9.8% from 18 to 24, 27.6% from 25 to 44, 22.6% from 45 to 64, and 17.0% who were 65 years of age or older. The median age was 38 years. For every 100 females, there were 85.9 males. For every 100 females age 18 and over, there were 78.4 males.

The median household income was $31,283 and the median family income was $37,763. Males had a median income of $27,857 compared with $19,211 for females. The per capita income for the city was $15,354. About 5.0% of families and 7.3% of the population were below the poverty line, including 8.8% of those under age 18 and 5.9% of those age 65 or over.

Notable people
John Travis Nixon (1867–1909), Louisiana newspaper publisher, born in Colchester
Lucy Smith Millikin (1821–1882), youngest sister of Mormon leader Joseph Smith; longtime resident (and among the founders) of Colchester

References

 
Cities in Illinois
Cities in McDonough County, Illinois